Before Dawn may refer to:

 Before Dawn (horse) (1979–2006), American racehorse
 Before Dawn: The Music of Yusef Lateef, a 1957 American jazz album featuring Yusef Lateef
 Before Dawn (film), a 1933 film
 Before Dawn (1953 film), Japanese film directed by Kōzaburō Yoshimura.
 Before Dawn (1984 film)
 Before Dawn (2006 film)
 Before Dawn (2013 film)

See also
 Before the Dawn (disambiguation)